Somerset Premier (known as Tribute Somerset Premier for sponsorship reasons) is an English rugby union league which sits at the eighth level of league rugby union in England involving teams based in the county of Somerset as well as some teams based in Bristol.  Originally a single division called Gloucestershire/Somerset, in 2000 the division split into two county leagues called Gloucester Premier and Somerset Premier.
 
The league champions of Somerset Premier are automatically promoted to Western Counties North while the runners up play the runners up of Gloucester Premier for their place.  Relegated teams drop into Somerset 1.  Only 1st XV sides can be promoted into Western Counties North, although any side can fall to Somerset 1.  Each season a 1st XV side from Somerset Premier is picked to take part in the RFU Senior Vase - a national competition for clubs at level 8.

Teams 2021-22

2020–21
Due to the COVID-19 pandemic, the 2020–21 season was cancelled.

Teams 2019–20

Teams 2018–19

Teams 2017–18

2016-17

Participating teams
Bridgwater & Albion II
Bristol Harlequins (relegated from Western Counties North)
Crewkerne (promoted from Somerset 1)
Gordano
Keynsham II
Hornets II
Nailsea & Backwell
Oldfield Old Boys
Old Redcliffians II 
St Bernadettes Old Boys
Stothert & Pitt RFC
Tor
Weston-super-Mare II
Winscombe
Wiveliscombe

1st XV teams participating in Somerset Regional Leagues

Somerset 1
Bristol Barbarians
Castle Cary
Imperial
Minehead Barbarians (relegated from Somerset Premier)
Old Sulians
Wyvern

Somerset 2 North
Bath Old Edwardians (promoted from Somerset 3 North)
Cheddar Valley (transferred from Somerset 2 South)
Old Culverhaysians

Somerset 2 South
Martock
Morganians
Somerton

Somerset 3 North
Avon II
Barton Hill II
Bristol Telephone Area
Imperial II
Keynsham IV
Nailsea & Backwell II
Old Bristolians III
Oldfield Old Boys III

Somerset 3 South
Wincanton

2015–16

The 2015–16 Somerset Premier consists of fourteen teams from Somerset and south-west Bristol. The season began on the 5 September 2015 and  ended on the 30 April 2016.

Participating teams and location
Eleven of the fourteen teams participated in last season's competition. The 2014–15 champions Gordano were promoted to Western Counties North while Bristol Imperial and Clevedon II were relegated to Somerset 1.

1st XV teams participating in Somerset Regional Leagues

Somerset 1
Bristol Barbarians
Castle Cray
Crewkerne
Imperial
Old Sulians
Wyvern

Somerset 2 North
Old Culverhaysians

Somerset 2 South
Cheddar Valley
Martock
Morganians
Somerton

Somerset 3 North
Bath Old Edwardians

Participating Clubs 2014/15
Clevedon II (promoted from Somerset 1)
Gordano
Imperial
Minehead Barbarians
Oldfield Old Boys (relegated from Western Counties North)
Old Redcliffians II
Nailsea & Backwell
St Bernadettes Old Boys
Taunton II
Tor
Weston-super-Mare II
Winscombe
Wiveliscombe
Yatton

Participating Clubs 2013/14
Bristol Barbarians
Gordano
Keynsham II
Minehead Barbarians
Nailsea & Backwell
Old Redcliffians II
St Bernadettes Old Boys (promoted from Somerset 1)
Stothert & Pitt	
Taunton II
Tor
Weston-super-Mare II
Winscombe
Wiveliscombe
Yatton (relegated from Western Counties North)

Participating Clubs 2012/13
Chew Valley
Gordano
Imperial
Keynsham
Midsomer Norton
Minehead Barbarians
Nailsea & Backwell
Old Redcliffians II
Stothert & Pitt
Taunton II
Tor
Weston-super-Mare II
Winscombe
Wiveliscombe

Participating Teams 2010/11
Avon 
Chard
Chew Valley 	
Gordano
Imperial 	
Midsomer Norton
Minehead Barbarians 	
St Bernadettes 
Stothert & Pitt
Taunton II
Tor
Wells
Weston Hornets 
Winscombe

Standings 2009/10 

1	Bristol Harlequins 40
2	Chard	           34
3	Taunton II	   33
4      Avon               33
5	Wells	           32
6	Stothert & Pitt	   18
7	Tor		   18
8	Midsomer Norton	   18
9	Chew Valley        16
10     St Bernadettes      9
11     Winscombe   8
12     Old Sulians         3

Standings 2008/09 

1	Burnham on Sea	   35
2	North Petherton	   34
3	Tor	           30
4      Bristol Harlequins 28
5	Stothert & Pitt	   26
6	Chew Valley	   20
7	Chard		   19
8	Midsomer Norton	   18
9	Winscombe          18
10     Wells              17
11     Avon               15
12     Old Sulians         4

Standings 2007/08 

1	Keynsham	40
2	Chew Valley	32
3	Winscombe	28
4	Wells	        26
5	Midsomer Norton	26
6	Avon	        22
7	Old Sulians	20
8	Stothert & Pitt	20
9	Chard	        18
10      Tor            16
11      Gordano	 8
12      St Bernadettes  6

Original teams
When league rugby began in 1987 this division (known as Gloucestershire/Somerset) contained the following teams:

Avonmouth Old Boys
Cleve
Combe Down
Coney Hill
Gordano
Keynsham
Midsomer Norton
Minehead Barbarians
St. Brendan's Old Boys
Tredworth
Whitehall

Somerset Premier honours

Gloucestershire/Somerset (1987–1993)

Originally Gloucester Premier and Somerset Premier were combined in a single division known as Gloucestershire/Somerset, involving teams based in Gloucestershire, Somerset and Bristol.  It was tier 8 league with promotion to Western Counties and relegation to either Gloucestershire 1 or Somerset 1.

Gloucestershire/Somerset (1993–1996)

The creation of National League 5 South for the 1993–94 season meant that Gloucestershire/Somerset dropped to become a tier 9 league.  Promotion continued to Western Counties and relegation to either Gloucester 1 or Somerset 1.

Gloucestershire/Somerset (1996–2000)

The cancellation of National League 5 South at the end of the 1995–96 season meant that Gloucestershire/Somerset reverted to being a tier 8 league.  Further restructuring meant that promotion was now to Western Counties North, while relegation continued to either Gloucester 1 or Somerset 1.

Somerset Premier (2000–2009)

Gloucestershire/Somerset was reorganised into two county leagues at the end of the 1999–00 season,  Gloucester Premier and Somerset Premier, with both leagues remaining at level 8.  Promotion from Somerset Premier was to Western Counties North and relegation to Somerset 1.  From the 2007–08 season onward the league sponsor would be Tribute.

Somerset Premier (2009–present)

Despite widespread restructing by the RFU at the end of the 2008–09 season, Somerset Premier remained a tier 8 league, with promotion continuing to Western Counties North and relegation to Somerset 1.  The league would continued to be sponsored by Tribute.

Promotion play-offs
Since the 2000–01 season there has been a play-off between the runners-up of the Gloucester Premier and Somerset Premier for the third and final promotion place to Western Counties North. The team with the superior league record has home advantage in the tie.  At the end of the 2019–20 season Gloucester Premier teams have been the most successful with thirteen wins to the Somerset Premier teams six; and the home team has won promotion on twelve occasions compared to the away teams seven.

Number of league titles

Gordano (3)
Bristol Harlequins (2)
Burnham-on-Sea (2)
Keynsham (2)
Old Redcliffians (2)
Avon (1)
Avonmouth Old Boys (1)
Barton Hill (1)
Chew Valley (1)
Combe Down (1)
Coney Hill (1)
Dings Crusaders (1)
Gloucester Old Boys (1)
Hornets (1)
Minehead Barbarians (1)
Old Centralians (1)
Old Culverhaysians (1)
Old Patesians (1)
Oldfield Old Boys (1)
Spartans (1)
St. Bernadette's Old Boys (1)
St. Mary's Old Boys (1)
Stothert & Pitt (1)
Walcot (1)
Winscombe (1)
Wiveliscombe (1)
Yatton (1)

Notes

See also 
 South West Division RFU
 Somerset RFU
 Somerset 1
 Somerset 2 North
 Somerset 2 South
 Somerset 3 North
 Somerset 3 South
 English rugby union system
 Rugby union in England

References 

RFU(2008) "Rugby First" Available at: http://clubs.rfu.com/Fixtures/ Accessed:8 August 2009

8
Rugby union in Somerset
Rugby union in Bristol